A list of actors who have appeared in the St Trinian's School films.

 Hermione Baddeley
 Dora Bryan
 George Cole
 Carole Ann Ford
 Joyce Grenfell
 Irene Handl
 Frankie Howerd
 Raymond Huntley
 Sid James
 Peter Jones
 John Le Mesurier
 Cecil Parker
 Beryl Reid
 Sabrina (actress)
 Terry Scott
 Alastair Sim
 Joan Sims
 Terry-Thomas
 Reg Varney
 Thorley Walters

References 

St Trinian's